Osterhaus may refer to:

People 
 Ab Osterhaus (born 1948), leading Dutch virologist, veterinarian and influenza expert
 Hugo Osterhaus (1851–1927), American admiral
 Peter Joseph Osterhaus (1823–1917), Prussian general in the Union Army in the American Civil War
 Robert Osterhaus (born 1931), American politician

Other uses 
 USS Osterhaus, United States Navy vessel during World War II

See also 
 Osterhausen, Saxony-Anhalt, Germany
 Østerhus, a village in Grimstad, Norway

German-language surnames